Martin-Michel-Charles Gaudin, 1st Duc de Gaete (19 January 1756 – 5 November 1841) was a French statesman who served as Minister of Finance of the French Empire under Napoleon I, from November 1799 to March 1814, and during the Hundred Days following Napoleon's return from exile in Elba.

Biography
Gaudin was born in Saint-Denis in 1756.

After Napoleon made him his Minister of Finance, where he held office until 1814, Gaudin organised the French direct contributions, reintroduced direct taxes ("droits réunis"), founded the Banque de France and the Cour des comptes, and set up the first cadaster, or record of land ownership as a basis of taxation.  He was rewarded in 1809 with the duché grand-fief of Gaeta, in the then-French controlled kingdom of Naples;  effectively, this was a life peerage, nominal but of high rank.  During the Hundred Days return, Bonaparte reserved a seat for Gaudin in the planned imperial Chamber of Peers, but that never materialised.

After the Bourbon restoration, he was deputy for the Aisne département, sitting with the constitutional party.

In 1820 he became governor of the Banque de France.

He died in the Gennevilliers château, near Paris, in 1841. He left his Memoirs, Opinions and Writings.

Sources
Larousse (undated French encyclopaedia, early 20th century)
Heraldica.org- Napoleonic heraldry

External links

1756 births
1841 deaths
Politicians from Paris
Governors of the Banque de France
French Ministers of Finance
Burials at Père Lachaise Cemetery
Dukes of the First French Empire